The 1929–30 Michigan Wolverines men's basketball team represented the University of Michigan in intercollegiate basketball during the 1929–30 season.  The team compiled a 9–5 record, and 6–4 against Big Ten Conference opponents.  The team finished in third place in the Big Ten.  Robert Chapman was the team captain, and Joe Truskowski was the team's leading scorer with 113 points in 14 games for an average of 8.1 points per game.

Scoring statistics

Coaching staff
Franklin Cappon - coach
Fielding H. Yost - athletic director

References

Michigan
Michigan Wolverines men's basketball seasons
Michigan Wolverines basketball
Michigan Wolverines basketball